Raymond Komba (born 17 April 1990), professionally known as Ray Keys, is a Nigerian-American songwriter and producer. He is recognized for his work on Tekashi 6ix9ine’s song ZAZA released in 2021 and Gifted by Cordae, released in 2020.

Early life and education 
Keys was born on 17 April 1990 in San Jose, California. Keys, while growing up, was highly influenced by Pharrell Williams, Dr. Dre, and Ryan Leslie. He later learned to play piano, drums and guitar.

Career 
Keys, during his career, has partnered with several producers including Carter Lang, Kid culture, Swagg R’Celious, BongoByTheWay, RoccStarr, and others. Keys’ unique technique of combining his music talent and reaching out to the artists on a deeper level resulted in Keys composing numerous hit songs along with several artists such as Chris Brown, Fivio foreign, Jack Harlow, Jeremih, Ty Dolla Sign, Dani Leigh, YBN Cordae, Teyana Taylor and Tekashi 6ix9ine.

Some of his works and collaborations include Tekashi 6ix9ine’s ZAZA, Cordae’s Gifted, Jason Derulo’s Let’s Shut Up & Dance, Dani Leigh’s Can’t Relate, and Takes Two.

Discography

References 

1990 births
Living people